Babella affectuosa is a species of sea snail, a marine gastropod mollusk in the family Pyramidellidae, the pyrams and their allies. The species is one of twelve known species within the Babella genus of Gastropods.

Description
The shell is approximately 4.7 millimeters in size.

Distribution
This marine species occurs in seas near the coasts of the Philippines and surrounding minor islands.

References

External links
 : Babella affectuosa

Pyramidellidae
Gastropods described in 1927